is one of the 18 wards of the city of Yokohama in Kanagawa Prefecture, Japan. As of 2010, the ward had an estimated population of 209,565 and a density of 6,760 persons per km². The ward symbol, established 1987, expresses the image of sea, waves, and a sea gull.

History
The area around present-day Kanazawa Ward has been inhabited for thousands of years. Archaeologists have found stone tools from the Japanese Paleolithic period and ceramic shards from the Jōmon period at numerous locations in the area. Under the Nara period Ritsuryō system, it became part of Kuraki District in Musashi Province. By the Kamakura period it was part of a shōen controlled by the Hōjō clan, who established a major seaport for the Kamakura shogunate at Mutsuura, and a noted library and educational center at Kanazawa Bunko.

During the Edo period, much of the area was part of the tenryō territory in Musashi Province controlled directly by the Tokugawa shogunate, but administered through various hatamoto. In 1726, a large portion of the present ward came under the control of the newly established Mutsuura Domain ruled by the Yonekura clan.  The area consisted of small farming and fishing villages. During the Bakumatsu period, the area offshore Kanazawa was an anchorage for the American black ships under command of Commodore Matthew C. Perry in 1853 and 1854. After the signing of the Treaty of Amity and Commerce in 1858, it was one of the first areas in Japan opened to foreign trade. In 1871, with the abolition of the han system following the Meiji Restoration, the area became part of Kuraki District in the new Kanagawa Prefecture. In 1887, Itō Hirobumi and a group of political scholars completed the final drafts of the Meiji Constitution while secluded in an inn in Kanazawa.  In the cadastral reform of April 1, 1889, the area was divided into numerous villages. The area was connected by rail to Yokohama with the opening of the Shōnan Electric Railway (the predecessor of the modern Keihin Electric Express Railway in 1930. In October 1936, Kuraki District was abolished, and the area was absorbed into Yokohama City, becoming part of Isogo Ward.  A large railway carriage factory was established in Kanazawa Ward in 1946 by the Tokyu Corporation on the site of a former Imperial Japanese Navy Technical Center. Kanazawa Ward gained its independence from Isogo Ward in May 1948.

Geography
Kanazawa Ward is located in eastern Kanagawa Prefecture, and in the southeast corner of the city of Yokohama. The area is largely flatland, with scattered small hills. The Ward is bordered to the east by Tokyo Bay.

Surrounding municipalities
Isogo Ward
Sakae Ward
Kamakura
Zushi
Yokosuka

Economy
Kanazawa Ward is largely a regional commercial center and bedroom community for central Yokohama, Kawasaki and Tokyo.

Transportation

Railroads
 Keihin Electric Express Railway-Keikyū Main Line
  -  -  - 
Keihin Electric Express Railway-Keikyū Zushi Line
  - 
 Yokohama New Transit Co., Ltd - Kanazawa Seaside Line
  -  -  -  -  -  -  -  -  -  -  -  -

Highways
Bayshore Route
Yokohama-Yokosuka Route
Japan National Route 16
Route 357 (Japan)

Prefecture roads
Kanagawa Prefecture Road 23
Kanagawa Prefecture Road 204
Kanagawa Prefecture Road 205

Attractions 
 Kanazawa Bunko
 Yokohama Hakkeijima Sea Paradise

Sports centers 
 Rinetsu Kanazawa (pool)
 Sports center of Kanazawa (indoor gym)

Beaches 
 Nojima Beach—It is the last remaining natural beach in Yokohama city. The beach is shallow for a good distance from the shore.
 Umi no Kouen—A city park with an artificial beach. The sand was carried by ship from Chiba prefecture. Visitors can go shellfish gathering there.

Fishing ports 
 Shiba fishing port
 Kanazawa fishing port

Education 
Tertiary:
 Yokohama City University
 Kanto Gakuin University

Kanagawa Prefectural Board of Education operates prefectural high schools:
 
 

 operates the following municipal high schools:
 

Private high schools:
 
 
 

The municipal board of education also operates public junior and senior high schools.

Nishi Kanazawa Elementary/Junior High School a.k.a. Nishi Kanazawa Gakuen (西金沢学園) is a combined elementary and junior high school in Kanazawa-ku.

Junior high schools:

 Daido (大道)
 Kamariya (釜利谷)
 Kanasawa (金沢)
 Koda (小田)
 Mutsuura (六浦)
 Namiki (並木)
 Nishishiba (西柴)
 Tomioka (富岡)
 Tomioka Higashi (富岡東)

Elementary schools:

 Asahina (朝比奈)
 Bunko (文庫)
 Daido (大道)
 Hakkei (八景)
 Kamariya (釜利谷)
 Kamariya Higashi (釜利谷東)
 Kamariya Minami (釜利谷南)
 Kanazawa (金沢)
 Koda (小田)
 Mutsuura (六浦)
 Mutsuura Minami (六浦南)
 Nishi Shiba (西柴)
 Nishi Tomioka (西富岡)
 Nokendai (能見台)
 Nokendai Minami (能見台南)
 Segasaki (瀬ケ崎)
 Takafunedai (高舟台)
 Tomiki Chuo (Central) (並木中央)
 Tomiki Daiichi (No. 1) (並木第一)
 Tomiki Daiyon (No. 4) (並木第四)
 Tomioka (富岡)

Additionally, Bairin Elementary School (梅林小学校), outside of Kanazawa-ku, has an attendance zone that includes a part of Kanazawa-ku.

Famous people 
 Teruo Iwamoto – professional soccer player
 Kazumasa Oda – singer, songwriter
 Koizumi Matajirō – politician
 Naoto Takenaka – actor
 Yuta Tabuse – professional basketball player
 Kota Yabu – actor, singer
 Max Matsuura – record producer
 Mitsuru Igarashi – musician
 Kōichirō Uno – novelist
 Katsumi Asaba – art director
 Tadanobu Asano – actor

References
 Kato, Yuzo. Yokohama Past and Present. Yokohama City University (1990).

External links
Kanazawa Ward Office
City of Yokohama statistics
 Yokohama Hakkeijima Sea Paradise
 Umino Kouen
 Nojima Beach
 

Wards of Yokohama